Tristan Henri Christiaan Hoffman (born 1 January 1970 in Groenlo, Oost Gelre) is a Dutch former road racing cyclist. He also competed in the men's individual road race at the 1996 Summer Olympics.

Palmarès

1991
1st, Overall, Ster Elektrotoer
1992
1st,   National Road Race Championships
1993
1st, Stage 1, Tour de l'Avenir
1st, Stage 3, Tour de Suisse
1994
1st, Stage 1, Herald Sun Tour
1995
1st, Stages 2 & 4, Tour of Sweden
1st, Stage, Vuelta a Murcia
1996
1st, Dwars door Vlaanderen
1st, Paris–Bourges
4th, Paris–Tours
1998
2nd, National Road Race Championships
1999
1st, Veenendaal–Veenendaal
1st, Clásica de Sabiñánigo
1st, Stage 1, Driedaagse van West-Vlaanderen
3rd, Gent–Wevelgem
2000
1st, Dwars door Vlaanderen
1st, Ronde van Made
4th, Paris–Roubaix
4th, Gent–Wevelgem
5th, Tour of Flanders
2001
5th, E3 Harelbeke
2002
4th, Paris–Roubaix
9th, Gent–Wevelgem
2004
2nd, Paris–Roubaix

See also
 List of Dutch Olympic cyclists

References

External links
 Official site 

1970 births
Living people
Dutch male cyclists
UCI Road World Championships cyclists for the Netherlands
Cyclists from Oost Gelre
Olympic cyclists of the Netherlands
Cyclists at the 1996 Summer Olympics
Tour de Suisse stage winners
20th-century Dutch people